258 (two hundred [and] fifty-eight) is the natural number following 257 and preceding 259.

In mathematics
258 is:
a sphenic number
a nontotient
the sum of four consecutive prime numbers because 258 = 59 + 61 + 67 + 71
63 + 62 + 6
an Ulam number

References

Integers